Nadhim al-Zahawi was Governor of the Central Bank of Iraq from May 1959 to November 1960. He was also Iraqi Minister of Trade.

His grandson is the British politician Nadhim Zahawi.

References 

Governors of the Central Bank of Iraq
Government ministers of Iraq